Scania aspersa is a moth of the family Noctuidae. It is found from the Maule Region to the Magallanes and Antartica Chilena Region of Chile, Colonia and Estanzuela in Uruguay and Comodoro Rivadavia, San Martín de los Andes, La Rioja, Cafayate, Salta, Nahuel Huapi, Neuquén, Chubut and Esquel in Argentina.

The wingspan is about 31 mm. Adults are on wing from October to March.

External links
 Noctuinae of Chile

Noctuinae